The following highways are numbered 40:

International
 European route E40

Argentina
 National Route 40

Australia
 NSW State Route 40 (Windsor Road and Victoria Road in Sydney)
 Victorian State Route 40
 Mulligan Highway (Queensland)

Brazil
 BR-040

Canada
 Alberta Highway 40
 Newfoundland and Labrador Route 40
 Ontario Highway 40
 Quebec Autoroute 40
 Saskatchewan Highway 40

China 
  G40 Expressway

Czech Republic
 I/40 Highway; Czech: Silnice I/40

Iceland
 Route 40 (Iceland)

India

Ireland
  N40 road (Ireland)

Israel
 Highway 40 (Israel)

Japan
 Japan National Route 40

Jordan

Korea, South
 Pyeongtaek–Jecheon Expressway
 National Route 40

Saudi Arabia
 Highway 40 (Saudi Arabia)

Sweden
Swedish road 40, formerly Swedish national road 40 connecting Göteborg, Borås, and Jönköping

Mexico
 Mexican Federal Highway 40

United Kingdom
 British A40 (London-Fishguard)
 British M40 (Denham-Earlswood)

United States
 Interstate 40
 Interstate 40 Business
 U.S. Route 40
 U.S. Route 40N (former)
 U.S. Route 40S (former)
 Alabama State Route 40
 Arkansas Highway 40 (1926-1958) (former)
 Colorado State Highway 40
 Connecticut Route 40
 Florida State Road 40
 County Road 40 (Levy County, Florida)
 County Road 40 (Marion County, Florida)
 Georgia State Route 40
Hawaii Route 40 (former)
 Idaho State Highway 40
 Illinois Route 40
 Kentucky Route 40
 Louisiana Highway 40
 Massachusetts Route 40
 M-40 (Michigan highway)
 Minnesota State Highway 40
 County Road 40 (Hennepin County, Minnesota)
 County Road 40 (Ramsey County, Minnesota)
 Missouri Route 40 (1922) (former)
 Montana Highway 40
 Nebraska Highway 40
 Nebraska Link 40C
 Nebraska Link 40G
 Nebraska Spur 40D
 Nebraska Recreation Road 40E
 Nevada State Route 40 (1935) (former)
 New Jersey Route 40 (former)
 County Route 40 (Bergen County, New Jersey)
 County Route 40 (Monmouth County, New Jersey)
 New Mexico State Road 40 (former)
 New York State Route 40
 County Route 40 (Allegany County, New York)
 County Route 40 (Cattaraugus County, New York)
 County Route 40 (Chenango County, New York)
 County Route 40 (Dutchess County, New York)
 County Route 40 (Genesee County, New York)
 County Route 40 (Greene County, New York)
 County Route 40 (Madison County, New York)
 County Route 40 (Niagara County, New York)
 County Route 40 (Oneida County, New York)
 County Route 40 (Otsego County, New York)
 County Route 40 (Putnam County, New York)
 County Route 40 (Rensselaer County, New York)
 County Route 40 (Schenectady County, New York)
 County Route 40 (St. Lawrence County, New York)
 County Route 40 (Suffolk County, New York)
 County Route 40 (Ulster County, New York)
 North Carolina Highway 40 (former)
 North Dakota Highway 40
 Ohio State Route 40 (1923-1927) (former)
Oklahoma State Highway 40 (former)
 South Carolina Highway 40 (former)
 South Dakota Highway 40
 Tennessee State Route 40
APD-40
 Texas State Highway 40
 Texas State Highway Loop 40
 Farm to Market Road 40
 Urban Road 40 (signed as Farm to Market Road 40)
 Texas Park Road 40
 Utah State Route 40 (former)
 Virginia State Route 40
 Virginia State Route 40 (1923-1933) (former)
West Virginia Route 40 (1920s) (former)
 Wisconsin Highway 40

Territories
 Puerto Rico Highway 40
 U.S. Virgin Islands Highway 40

See also 
 A40 (disambiguation)#Roads
 List of highways numbered 40A